City Tower (formerly Sunley House) is a 30-storey skyscraper situated in the Piccadilly Gardens area of Manchester city centre in England.

History
City Tower was completed in 1965, one of three buildings forming the Piccadilly Plaza complex which was designed by Covell, Matthews & Partners and developed by Bernard Sunley & Sons between 1959 and 1965.

The Piccadilly Plaza was remodelled by Leslie Jones Architects in 2001-02. City Tower stands at right angles to Piccadilly and the north-facing wall is covered with designs based on circuit boards. During the remodelling of the building to the west of City Tower, Eagle Star House was replaced by a building whose roofs are a pale echo of the swooping roofs of the original.

The Tower has retail and leisure units on the ground floor and is Manchester's main radio transmitting station, which is located on the roof. The developer Bruntwood sold City Tower to the asset management company Schroders for £132 million in 2014, but kept their headquarters in the building.

Description
The Tower has entrances on York Street (renamed New York Street in 2008) and Piccadilly Gardens (formerly Parker Street). A refurbishment programme was drawn up in the late 1990s, but this was never realised until Bruntwood purchased Piccadilly Plaza for £65 million in 2004. This plan is complete, with a new central ground floor entrance. The next phase involved repainting and fitting an atrium to the sides of the Tower. An advertising screen has been erected showing video clips to passers-by in the Gardens.

The Tower is one of Manchester's main broadcast transmission sites, hosting the antennae of local radio stations Radio X, XS Manchester and Capital on FM and digital radio multiplexes Digital One, BBC and CE Manchester.

The penthouse on floor 28 differs from the other floors as it originally had a walkway around the perimeter. When Bruntwood acquired City Tower, they removed the walkway and installed wider windows. The redesign included an overhang with floor to ceiling windows.

Although City Tower is not the tallest building in the city, the 28th floor is the highest commercial office space in Manchester. This floor was occupied by UKFast but now appears to be at least partly vacant.

Gallery

See also
Architecture of Manchester
List of tallest buildings in Manchester
List of tallest buildings in the United Kingdom

References

External links

 City Tower, Manchester at www.skyscrapernews.com
    BBC Highest office space in Manchester
    City Tower Official Website

City Tower
Office buildings completed in 1965
Skyscrapers in Manchester
Skyscraper office buildings in England
Ralph Covell buildings
Piccadilly Gardens
Modernist architecture in England